"Let It Be You" is a song written by Kevin Welch and Harry Stinson, and recorded by American country music artist Ricky Skaggs.  It was released in July 1989 as the second single from the album Kentucky Thunder.  The song reached #5 on the Billboard Hot Country Singles chart.

Chart performance

Year-end charts

References

1989 singles
Ricky Skaggs songs
Songs written by Kevin Welch
Song recordings produced by Steve Buckingham (record producer)
Song recordings produced by Ricky Skaggs
Epic Records singles
1989 songs
Songs written by Harry Stinson (musician)